Heterachthes x-notatum is a species of beetle in the family Cerambycidae. It was described by Linsley in 1935. Under Article 31.2.1 of the International Code of Zoological Nomenclature, the species name must be spelled x-notatum, as letters of the alphabet are neuter in gender.

References

Heterachthes
Beetles described in 1935